Roxburgh was an electoral district of the Legislative Assembly in the Australian state of New South Wales from 1856 to 1859, named after Roxburgh County. It included Sofala. For the 1859 election the district divided, principally the northern portion in Hartley and the south western portion in East Macquarie.

Members for Roxburgh

Election results

1856

1858

References

Roxburgh
1856 establishments in Australia
1859 disestablishments in Australia